Elizabeth Rose was a 12th-century nun.

Elizabeth Rose may also refer to:
 Elizabeth Rose, Lady of Kilravock (1747–1815), Scottish literary critic and author
 Elizabeth Rose (musician), Australian DJ, producer and singer-songwriter
 Elizabeth Rose, a character in the film Along Came a Spider
 Liz Rose, songwriter

See also